The Walter S. Zimmerman House is a historic house located in Portland, Oregon, United States. The Portland architect Wade Hampton Pipes (1877–1961) was the most prominent advocate of the English Arts and Crafts movement in Oregon and established a wide, exclusively residential, body of work in the English Cottage style during his active career (beginning 1911). This 1931 house, designed for the logging and railway businessman Walter Zimmerman, represents a transitional step in the evolution of Pipes's work, moving from traditional stucco walls to brick and adding other Modern details.

The house was added to the National Register of Historic Places in 1991.

See also
National Register of Historic Places listings in Southwest Portland, Oregon

References

External links

Houses on the National Register of Historic Places in Portland, Oregon
Houses completed in 1931
1931 establishments in Oregon
Arts and Crafts architecture in Oregon
Southwest Hills, Portland, Oregon
Portland Historic Landmarks